Mineralne is a settlement in Yasynuvata Raion (district) in Donetsk Oblast of eastern Ukraine, at 11.3 km NNE from the centre of Donetsk city, on the right bank of the Kalmius river.


History

War in Donbas
The settlement was taken under control of pro-Russian forces during the War in Donbas, that started in 2014.

Demographics
The settlement had 405 inhabitants in 2001; native language distribution as of the Ukrainian Census of 2001:
Ukrainian: 54.81%
Russian: 44.69%
Armenian: 0.5%

References

Rural settlements in Donetsk Oblast